Sixten Sild (born 19 June 1964, in Tartu) is an Estonian orienteering competitor, bronze medallist for the  Soviet Union in the world championships, and later competing for Estonia.

He received a bronze medal in the classic course at the World Orienteering Championships in Mariánské Lázně in 1991. He finished 4th in the relay in 1989, and 5th in 1991 with the Soviet team.

Sild's best overall performance in the Orienteering World Cup was finishing 8th in 1996. Other World Cup overall results: 1990: 16th; 1992: 12th; 1994: 20th; 1998: 24th.

His sons Timo Sild and Lauri Sild are also active orienteers and competing at an international level.

See also
 Estonian orienteers
 List of orienteers
 List of orienteering events

References

External links
 
 Sixten Sild at World of O Runners

1964 births
Living people
Estonian orienteers
Soviet orienteers
Male orienteers
Foot orienteers
World Orienteering Championships medalists
Sportspeople from Tartu